Umberto Drei (1 May 1925 – 14 January 1996) was an Italian racing cyclist. He rode in the 1948 Tour de France.

References

External links
 

1925 births
1996 deaths
Italian male cyclists
Cyclists from Emilia-Romagna